Luka Božičković (born 2 September 2003)  is a professional footballer who plays as a midfielder for Slovenian PrvaLiga side Maribor. Born in Germany, he represented Bosnia and Herzegovina at youth international level.

Club career 
Božičković grew up in Reinbek, Germany, and began his football career with local team Concordia. Between 2017 and 2022, he played for the Hamburger SV academy, before moving to Slovenian PrvaLiga side Maribor in January 2022. After a brief spell with the Maribor's under-19 team in the second part of the 2021–22 season, Božičković made his league debut for the club on 18 September 2022 in a 5–0 win against Radomlje, where he also scored his first senior goal in the final minutes of the match. In February 2023, he extended his contract with Maribor until the summer of 2025.

International career 
Božičković represented Bosnia and Herzegovina at the under-17, under-19, and under-21 level.

Personal life 
Božičković has a younger brother, Niko, who is also a footballer and a youth international for Bosnia and Herzegovina.

References

External links 
 Luka Božičković at Soccerway

2003 births
Living people
People from Stormarn (district)
Association football midfielders
German footballers
Bosnia and Herzegovina footballers
Bosnia and Herzegovina youth international footballers
Hamburger SV players
NK Maribor players
Slovenian PrvaLiga players
Bosnia and Herzegovina expatriate footballers
Expatriate footballers in Slovenia
Bosnia and Herzegovina expatriate sportspeople in Slovenia